Screen Actors Guild Awards (also known as SAG Awards) are accolades given by the Screen Actors Guild-American Federation of Television and Radio Artists (SAG-AFTRA). The award was founded in 1995 to recognize outstanding performances in movie and prime time television. SAG Awards have been one of the major awards events in the Hollywood film industry since then, along with the Golden Globes and the Oscars. SAG awards focus both on individual performances and on the work of the entire ensemble of a drama series and comedy series, and the cast of a motion picture.

Nominations for the awards come from two committees, one for film and one for television, each numbering 2,100 members of the union, randomly selected anew each year, with the full membership (165,000 as of 2012) available to vote for the winners. It is considered an indicator of success at the Academy Awards in acting categories. The awards have been telecast on TNT from 1998 to 2022, and have been simulcast on TBS from 2007 to 2022. In May 2022 it was announced that both TNT and TBS will no longer air the awards. In January 2023, it was announced that Netflix will air the awards live beginning in 2024 as part of a new multi-year partnership, with the 2023 ceremony being announced to be live streamed on Netflix's YouTube channel as Netflix was still working out its live streaming capabilities at the time of the announcement.

The inaugural SAG Awards aired live on February 25, 1995, from Universal Studios' Stage 12. The second SAG awards aired live from the Santa Monica Civic Auditorium, while subsequent awards have been held at the Shrine Auditorium. On December 4, 2017, it was announced that the awards show would have its first ever host in its then twenty-four year history, with actress Kristen Bell presiding over the ceremony. As of 2021, Shakespeare in Love is the only film to receive nominations for all four acting categories and the ensemble award.

The statuette given, a nude male figure holding both a mask of comedy and a mask of tragedy, is called "The Actor".

Ceremonies
 1995: 1st Screen Actors Guild Awards, for the year 1994
 1996: 2nd Screen Actors Guild Awards, for the year 1995
 1997: 3rd Screen Actors Guild Awards, for the year 1996
 1998: 4th Screen Actors Guild Awards, for the year 1997
 1999: 5th Screen Actors Guild Awards, for the year 1998
 2000: 6th Screen Actors Guild Awards, for the year 1999
 2001: 7th Screen Actors Guild Awards, for the year 2000
 2002: 8th Screen Actors Guild Awards, for the year 2001
 2003: 9th Screen Actors Guild Awards, for the year 2002
 2004: 10th Screen Actors Guild Awards, for the year 2003
 2005: 11th Screen Actors Guild Awards, for the year 2004
 2006: 12th Screen Actors Guild Awards, for the year 2005
 2007: 13th Screen Actors Guild Awards, for the year 2006
 2008: 14th Screen Actors Guild Awards, for the year 2007
 2009: 15th Screen Actors Guild Awards, for the year 2008
 2010: 16th Screen Actors Guild Awards, for the year 2009
 2011: 17th Screen Actors Guild Awards, for the year 2010
 2012: 18th Screen Actors Guild Awards, for the year 2011
 2013: 19th Screen Actors Guild Awards, for the year 2012
 2014: 20th Screen Actors Guild Awards, for the year 2013
 2015: 21st Screen Actors Guild Awards, for the year 2014
 2016: 22nd Screen Actors Guild Awards, for the year 2015
 2017: 23rd Screen Actors Guild Awards, for the year 2016
 2018: 24th Screen Actors Guild Awards, for the year 2017
 2019: 25th Screen Actors Guild Awards, for the year 2018
 2020: 26th Screen Actors Guild Awards, for the year 2019
 2021: 27th Screen Actors Guild Awards, for the year 2020
 2022: 28th Screen Actors Guild Awards, for the year 2021
 2023: 29th Screen Actors Guild Awards, for the year 2022

Categories

Film 
 Outstanding Performance by a Cast in a Motion Picture
 Outstanding Performance by a Male Actor in a Leading Role in a Motion Picture
 Outstanding Performance by a Female Actor in a Leading Role in a Motion Picture
 Outstanding Performance by a Male Actor in a Supporting Role in a Motion Picture
 Outstanding Performance by a Female Actor in a Supporting Role in a Motion Picture
 Outstanding Performance by a Stunt Ensemble in a Motion Picture

Television 
 Outstanding Performance by an Ensemble in a Drama Series
 Outstanding Performance by an Ensemble in a Comedy Series
 Outstanding Performance by a Male Actor in a Drama Series
 Outstanding Performance by a Female Actor in a Drama Series
 Outstanding Performance by a Male Actor in a Comedy Series
 Outstanding Performance by a Female Actor in a Comedy Series
 Outstanding Performance by a Male Actor in a Television Movie or Limited Series
 Outstanding Performance by a Female Actor in a Television Movie or Limited Series
 Outstanding Performance by a Stunt Ensemble in a Comedy or Drama Series

Life Achievement 
 Screen Actors Guild Life Achievement Award

Superlatives

Per performer

Multiple wins 
(Minimum of 3 wins)

Multiple nominations 
(Minimum of 10 nominations)

Per film

Multiple wins

Multiple nominations
Note: Winners are indicated in bold type.

Per TV

Multiple wins (throughout seasons)
(Minimum of 3 wins)

Multiple nominations (throughout seasons) 
(Minimum of 10 nominations)

References

External links 

 

 
Performing arts trophies
Awards established in 1995
1995 establishments in California